William Smith (22 September 1756 – 31 May 1835) was a leading independent British politician, sitting as Member of Parliament (MP) for more than one constituency. He was an English Dissenter and was instrumental in bringing political rights to that religious minority. He was a friend and close associate of William Wilberforce and a member of the Clapham Sect of social reformers, and was in the forefront of many of their campaigns for social justice, prison reform and philanthropic endeavour, most notably the abolition of slavery. He was the grandfather of pioneer nurse and statistician Florence Nightingale and educationalist Barbara Bodichon, a founder of Girton College, Cambridge.

Early life
William Smith was born on 22 September 1756 at Clapham (then a village to the south of London), the only son of Samuel Smith by Martha, daughter of William Adams of London. Brought up by parents who worshipped at an Independent chapel, he was educated at the dissenting academy at Daventry until 1772, where he began to come under the influence of Unitarians. He went into the family grocery business and by 1777 had become a partner. Smith had a long career as a social and political reformer, joining the Society for Constitutional Information in 1782.

Election to parliament
In 1784 Smith was elected as one of the two Members of Parliament for Sudbury in Suffolk. He was active in his support for the Whigs while in opposition. In 1790 he lost his seat at Sudbury and in the following January was elected as one of the members for Camelford.  In 1796 he was again returned for Sudbury, but in 1802 accepted the invitation of radicals to stand for Norwich, although he was defeated in the election of 1806, which was fought on a local issue. However, enough Whigs were elected to form the next government, led by Lord Grenville. Smith was returned again in 1807 and 1812 and became a popular and outspoken radical Member of Parliament for Norwich, which was known for being a gathering place for dissenters and radicals of all kinds.

Unitarianism
William Smith held strong dissenting Christian convictions – he was a Unitarian, and was thus prevented from attaining the Great Offices of State. (The doctrine of Unitarians was to deny the truth of the Trinity, a central tenet of the Church of England.) He nevertheless played a leading role in most of the great contemporary parliamentary issues, including the Dissenters' demands for the repeal of the Test and Corporation Acts (for the first time since the 1730s). Although the campaigners were unsuccessful in 1787, they tried again in 1789. When Charles Fox introduced a bill for the relief of Nontrinitarianism in May 1792, Smith supported the Unitarian Society, publicly declaring his commitment to the Unitarian cause. The same year he became one of the founding members of the Friends of the People Society. In 1813 Smith challenged the established church, and was responsible for championing the Doctrine of the Trinity Act 1813, known as 'Mr William Smith's Bill', which, for the first time, made it legal to practice Unitarianism. He was a member of the Essex Street Chapel.

Abolitionism
In June 1787, Smith was one of the first to campaign for the abolition of the slave trade, becoming a vocal advocate for the cause. In 1790 he supported William Wilberforce in the slave trade debate in April. While he had been out of parliament he had given his support to Abolitionism by writing a pamphlet entitled A Letter to William Wilberforce (1807), in which he cogently and convincingly summarised the abolitionists' arguments for abolition.  Once the trade had been halted, he turned his attention to freeing those who were already slaves. In 1823 with Zachary Macaulay he helped found the London Society for the Abolition of Slavery in our Colonies, thereby launching the next phase of the campaign to eradicate slavery.

French Revolution
In the beginning, at least, William Smith was sympathetic to the revolutionary movement in France. He visited Paris in 1790, where he attended the 14 July celebrations, and later recorded his reactions to the momentous events he witnessed. In April 1791 he publicly supported the aims and principles of the newly formed Unitarian Society, including support for the recently won liberty of the French (see Revolution Controversy). Smith was swiftly gaining a reputation as a radical, even a Jacobin, becoming known as "King-Killer Smith" in allusion to the execution of Louis XVI, which he had defended in Parliament on grounds that the cruelty of the revolutionaries was equalled by that of previous French monarchs. Because he had business contacts and friends in Paris, he was more than once asked to act as a go-between for the government. In 1792 he arranged several meetings between William Pitt and Hugues-Bernard Maret, later Napoleon's foreign minister, in an attempt to avoid war.

Later life
He was elected a Fellow of the Royal Society in 1806 as "a Gentleman well versed in various branches of Natural Knowledge".

As an MP, Smith witnessed the assassination of prime minister Spencer Perceval who fell close by him. He immediately identified his body on sight of his face, having initially thought it was William Wilberforce who had been shot.

Smith finally saw through parliament the repeal of the Test Acts in 1828. He died on 31 May 1835 in London, at the age of 78.

Family
On 12 September 1781 Smith married Frances Coape (1758 – 1840), daughter of John and Hannah Coape, both Dissenters. They had five sons and five daughters.

Of the sons:

the eldest was Benjamin Smith, the Whig politician. He fathered Barbara Bodichon, founder of Girton College, and the explorer Benjamin Leigh Smith.
the second, William Adams Smith (1789–1870), was known as an activist.
Samuel (1794–1880), married Mary Shore.
Octavius (1796–1871), married Jane Cooke, and had eight children.
Frederick (1798–1882), married Mary Yates.

The third daughter, Frances Smith (1789–1880), married William Nightingale and was the mother of Florence Nightingale. Of the other daughters, Joanna Maria (1791–1884) married MP John Bonham-Carter (1788–1838) and founded the Bonham Carter family. Martha Frances (1782–1870, Patty) and Julia (1799–1881) did not marry; Anne (1785–1854) married George Thomas Nicholson.

The Smiths lived near the family business, and moved into Eagle House on Clapham Common.

References

External links
 

1756 births
1835 deaths
British MPs 1784–1790
British MPs 1790–1796
British MPs 1796–1800
Clapham Sect
English abolitionists
English Unitarians
Fellows of the Royal Society
Florence Nightingale
Members of the Parliament of Great Britain for constituencies in Cornwall
Members of the Parliament of Great Britain for English constituencies
Members of the Parliament of the United Kingdom for English constituencies
UK MPs 1802–1806
UK MPs 1807–1812
UK MPs 1812–1818
UK MPs 1818–1820
UK MPs 1820–1826
Whig (British political party) MPs
Crime witnesses